Heinrich Aigner (25 May 1924 – 24 March 1988) was a German politician, representative of the Christian Social Union of Bavaria.
He was born in Ebrach and died in Amberg.

See also
List of Bavarian Christian Social Union politicians

References

1924 births
1988 deaths
Commanders Crosses of the Order of Merit of the Federal Republic of Germany
People from Bamberg (district)
Members of the Bundestag for Bavaria
Members of the Bundestag 1976–1980
Members of the Bundestag 1972–1976
Members of the Bundestag 1969–1972
Members of the Bundestag 1965–1969
Members of the Bundestag 1961–1965
Members of the Bundestag 1957–1961
Members of the Bundestag for the Christian Social Union in Bavaria